Ikonnikovo is a rural locality (a village) in Ramenskoye Rural Settlement, Syamzhensky District, Vologda Oblast, Russia. The population was 12 as of 2002.

Geography 
Ikonnikovo is located 43 km north of Syamzha (the district's administrative centre) by road. Oparikha is the nearest rural locality.

References 

Rural localities in Syamzhensky District